Deuterotinea maracandica is a moth in the Eriocottidae family. It was described by Zagulajev in 1988. It is found in Uzbekistan.

References

Moths described in 1988
Eriocottidae
Insects of Central Asia